Crofton Downs is an inner suburb of Wellington, the capital city of New Zealand. It is situated between Ngaio to the northeast Wilton to the south-west and Wadestown to the south. Its border runs on the Korimako Stream that flows south into the Kaiwharawhara Stream and then flows down the Ngaio Gorge into Wellington Harbour.

History and etymology
The area was before 1870 was called Upper Kaiwarra (a corruption of Kaiwharawhara), after 1870 Crofton (including neighbouring Ngaio). In 1908 was renamed Ngaio, then in 1950s the western side of Ngaio became Crofton Downs. Crofton Downs taking its name from a house built in the 1857 by then Premier, William Fox. Crofton House, which was likely named after his wife's birthplace of Crofton in Wiltshire, England, still stands today and is at 21 Kenya Street.

Many of the street names in the suburb such as Winston Street, Downing Street and Chartwell Drive are a tribute to the life of former British prime minister Sir Winston Churchill; Chartwell was Churchill's country home. Admiralty Street comes from 'First Lord of the Admiralty' which is appointed by the UK Prime Minister. Chequers Way is from Chequers the official residence of the UK Prime Minister. Doris Gordon Crescent is named after the New Zealand doctor.

Silverstream (the river) and Silverstream Road are named after Silverstream Dairy farm (formally Caseys Farm). This farm merged with Sky Farm to the North (gives its name to Skyline track). Silversky Park and track being the link between the two.

Demographics 

Crofton Downs had a population of 1,641 at the 2018 New Zealand census, an increase of 93 people (6.0%) since the 2013 census, and an increase of 231 people (16.4%) since the 2006 census. There were 639 households. There were 786 males and 852 females, giving a sex ratio of 0.92 males per female. The median age was 39.6 years (compared with 37.4 years nationally), with 330 people (20.1%) aged under 15 years, 261 (15.9%) aged 15 to 29, 837 (51.0%) aged 30 to 64, and 207 (12.6%) aged 65 or older.

Ethnicities were 82.6% European/Pākehā, 6.8% Māori, 3.3% Pacific peoples, 13.5% Asian, and 2.9% other ethnicities (totals add to more than 100% since people could identify with multiple ethnicities).

The proportion of people born overseas was 33.6%, compared with 27.1% nationally.

Although some people objected to giving their religion, 56.5% had no religion, 30.3% were Christian, 1.5% were Hindu, 0.5% were Muslim, 1.6% were Buddhist and 2.7% had other religions.

Of those at least 15 years old, 699 (53.3%) people had a bachelors or higher degree, and 57 (4.3%) people had no formal qualifications. The median income was $54,400, compared with $31,800 nationally. The employment status of those at least 15 was that 768 (58.6%) people were employed full-time, 201 (15.3%) were part-time, and 42 (3.2%) were unemployed.

Local facilities
Crofton Downs has its own railway station (with coffee shop) on the Johnsonville Line for commuters to Wellington Station to the South and going to Ngaio, Khandallah and Johnsonville to the north. 

Near the station on Churchill Drive is Churchill Drive Shopping Centre with a supermarket, cafe, pharmacy, a Mitre 10 DIY hardware store, a veterinary clinic,  and adjacent petrol station.

The Countdown supermarket was expanded in 2013 and now covers an area of 3,400 m².

Bowen Hospital
Bowen Hospital is run by a private charitable trust.  Now located on Churchill Drive on the southern part of Crofton Downs, it was established on Bowen Street opposite Parliament in 1912. The old building was closed in 1965 and it moved here. 

A BUPA retirement village opened in Crofton Downs next to Bowen Hospital in 2022.

Open space and parks
Crofton Downs is surrounded by parks and reserves. To the west, north-west and north it is encircled by the city council-owned Skyline walkway park, the park featuring 'the crows nest' a popular peak at 385m high. The access is from the Silversky Walkway and vehicles from Chartwell drive and Chartwell reserve. Huntleigh Park forms the northern edge of Crofton Downs with neighbouring Ngaio, Trelissick Park runs to the east of the train station and line and Otari-Wilton's Bush to the south east.

Huntleigh Park

Huntleigh Park provides a backup community water facility in case emergency event such as a quake that disrupt supplies.

Huntleigh Guide Centre in Huntleigh park off Silverstream Road is a community facility that can seat up to 100 people.

Education

School enrollment zone
Crofton Downs is within the enrollment zones for Wellington Girls' College, Onslow College, St Oran's College and Raroa Normal Intermediate.

Primary school

Crofton Downs Primary school is a Decile 10 coeducational contributing state school catering to years 1 to 6. Formerly called Chartwell School, the school was opened in 1970. Its name was changed to Crofton Downs Primary school in 2008 as the surrounding area is now more commonly referred to as Crofton Downs rather than Chartwell.

Pre-school

Ngaio Playcentre is parent led preschool based in Huntleigh Park, Crofton Downs, which caters for children aged 0 to 6 years old. Originally based in Ngaio town hall it moved into Huntleigh Park in the mid-1970s.

Transport

The suburb is served by the Johnsonville Branch commuter railway which connects it to the central city and stops at Johnsonville. It is one stop to Wellington Central Station, and the journey takes 9 minutes. In addition, the number 22 bus running to and from Johnsonville to Wellington stops in Crofton Downs during the weekdays.

Predator Free Crofton Downs
Crofton Downs was the first New Zealand Suburb to be declared predator-free after local community group, Predator Free Crofton Downs, arranged stoat and rat traps for over 200 households throughout the suburb. Since its inception in 2014, the community model has inspired other communities throughout New Zealand to start their own predator free groups.

References

External links
Crofton Downs history
Crofton Downs Primary School
Ngaio Playcentre
ウェリントン補習授業校 Japan-New Zealand Joint Venture School
https://www.metlink.org.nz/getting-around/trains/metlink-railway-stations/crofton-downs-station/

Suburbs of Wellington City